IQ calmodulin-binding motif-containing protein 1 is a protein that in humans is encoded by the IQCB1 gene.

References

Further reading